Waukomis is a town in Garfield County, Oklahoma, United States. The population was 1,286 at the 2010 census, an increase of 2.0 percent from 1,261 in 2000.

Geography
Waukomis is located south of the center of Garfield County at  (36.280604, -97.902189). U.S. Route 81 forms the eastern border of the town; the highway leads north  to Enid, the county seat, and south  to Hennessey.

Demographics

As of the census in 2021, there is 1,227 people, 510 households, and 352 families residing in the town. There were 567 housing units at an average density of 184.6 per square mile (71.3/km2). The racial make-up of the town was 92.31% White, 0.71% African American, 3.41% Native American, 0.16% Asian, 0.71% from other races, and 2.70% from two or more races. Hispanic or Latino of any race were 1.35% of the population.

There were 510 households, out of which 36.1% had children under the age of 18 living with them, 56.5% were married couples living together, 10.4% had a female householder with no husband present, and 30.8% were non-families. 27.8% of all households were made up of individuals, and 11.8% had someone living alone who was 65 years of age or older. The average household size was 2.47 and the average family size was 3.05.

In the town, the population was spread out, with 27.7% under the age of 18, 9.7% from 18 to 24, 27.6% from 25 to 44, 23.7% from 45 to 64, and 11.3% who were 65 years of age or older. The median age was 36 years. For every 100 females, there were 92.5 males. For every 100 females age 18 and over, there were 90.4 males.

The median income for a household in the town was $59,450. Males had a median income of $26,959 versus $21,641 for females. The per capita income for the town was $14,213. About 12.8% of families and 14.8% of the population were below the poverty line, including 16.0% of those under age 18 and 13.3% of those age 65.

Education
Waukomis is in the Waukomis Public Schools district.

References

External links
Waukomis Public Schools

Towns in Garfield County, Oklahoma
Towns in Oklahoma